Elections were held in Maine on November 2, 2010.  Primary elections took place on June 8, 2010 for the Democratic Party, Republican Party, and Green Party.

Federal

United States House

Both of Maine's seats in the  United States House of Representatives will be up for election in 2010.  In District 1, Democratic incumbent Chellie Pingree will face Republican Dean Peter Scontras, co-owner of an alternative energy company.  In District 2, Democratic incumbent Mike Michaud will face Republican Jason John Levesque, founder of direct-response marketing firm Argo Marketing.

State

Governor

Incumbent Governor John Baldacci is term-limited and could not run for re-election in 2010.  Republican Paul LePage narrowly beat Independent Eliot Cutler in the 5-way race.

State Senate
All 35 seats of the Maine Senate were up for election in 2010.

State House of Representatives
All 151 seats in the Maine House of Representatives were up for election in 2010.

Judicial positions
Multiple judicial positions will be up for election in 2010.
Maine judicial elections, 2010 at Judgepedia

Ballot measures
Five measures were approved in the June 8 election.
Three measures will appear on the November 2 general election ballot:
1. conservation bonds
2. dental care bonds
3. a casino in Oxford
Maine 2010 ballot measures at Ballotpedia

Local

County races
The following county offices, which vary depending on the county, are up for election in 2010:  Judge of Probate, Register of Probate, County Treasurer, Register of Deeds, Sheriff, District Attorney and County Commissioner.

References

External links
Elections & Voting from the Maine Secretary of State
Candidates for Maine State Offices at Project Vote Smart
Maine Polls at Pollster.com

Maine Congressional Races in 2010 campaign finance data from OpenSecrets
Maine 2010 campaign finance data from Follow the Money
 Imagine Election - Find out which candidates will appear on your ballot - search by address or zip code.

 
Maine